María Olay García (born 3 June 1978 in Gijón, Asturias) is a former breaststroke swimmer from Spain, who competed at the 1996 Summer Olympics in Atlanta, Georgia for her native country. In the Georgia Tech Aquatic Center she finished in 28th place in the 100 m breaststroke, and was eliminated with the women's relay team in the 4×100 m medley (15th position).

References
 Spanish Olympic Committee

1978 births
Living people
Sportspeople from Gijón
Spanish female breaststroke swimmers
Olympic swimmers of Spain
Swimmers at the 1996 Summer Olympics
European Aquatics Championships medalists in swimming